Cryptolectica euryphanta is a moth of the family Gracillariidae. It is known from Namibia, the Seychelles and South Africa.

References

Acrocercopinae
Moths of Africa
Insects of Namibia
Moths described in 1911